The Groove Coaster series is an iOS / Android and arcade rhythm game franchise developed by Matrix Software and published by Taito.  The first Groove Coaster was released for iOS on July 28, 2011.  This rhythm game follows a roller coaster type track on screen, where players must make the appropriate controller inputs.  Like many rhythm games, a life bar is attached to the game play.  Players gain or lose points on the bar depending on the input timings.

Releases
Groove Coaster Zero is a free-to-play updated version of the game released on November 20, 2012.

The Groove Coaster arcade version (known as Rhythmvaders in some areas outside Japan) was released on November 5, 2013, with the touchscreen replaced by two giant controllers called "BOOSTERs" with a white button on each.

Groove Coaster EX (known as Rhythmvaders EX in some areas outside Japan) is an update of the arcade version released on May 26, 2014.

Groove Coaster 2: Heavenly Festival (known as Rhythmvaders 2 in some areas outside Japan) was released on January 22, 2015, in which the "LEVEL" system was removed and was replaced by a new system called the "GROOVE COIN" system, in which players can get "GROOVE COINs" according to their performance and use them as currency for virtual goods.

Groove Coaster 2: Original Style was released on iOS and Android on July 1, 2015. In this version, stage charts from arcade version are added for some tracks, which makes two-finger play available. A new input mode is introduced, in which players play the stages by making sound instead of touching the screen.

Groove Coaster 3: Link Fever was released on March 10, 2016, in which an online multiplayer system is added and the "MUSIC PANEL" system is removed. A fictional navigator, Linka (リンカ, voiced by Moe Toyota in Japanese version and Jennifer Skidmore in overseas versions), who will guide the player throughout the whole playthrough, is introduced as well.

Groove Coaster 3EX: Dream Party was released on March 16, 2017. In this version, the player is allowed to select the navigators. A new navigator, Yume (ユメ, voiced by Nanami Takahashi in Japanese version) is added as well. Also, Solo Event Mode, similar to the one until 2HF, returned in 3EXDP.

Groove Coaster 4: Starlight Road, was released on March 29, 2018, with a brand new "LEVEL" system, in which the Difficulty level range is re-arranged from 1 to 15, a new stage unlocking system, and various new functions online. A new navigator for 4SR, named Seine (voiced by Eriko Kawakami), is introduced as well.

Groove Coaster was released on Steam on July 16, 2018.

Groove Coaster: Wai Wai Party!!!! was released on Nintendo Switch on November 7, 2019.

Gameplay
When the avatar reaches the target, input the command that the target requires. After a target is hit, a judgment is received, from the highest to lowest: GREAT, COOL, GOOD and MISS, depending on the timing of hitting the target. GREAT, COOL and GOOD fill the GROOVE gauge on the top of the screen, while MISS depletes it (Starting from 4SR, the FAST or SLOW is displayed on the top-right of the avatar, if COOL and GOOD is received). The player is required to fill up at least 70% of the GROOVE gauge to clear the stage (the gauge will flash in white in iOS version, yellow in arcade version) when the song ends, otherwise fails it.

As the player continuously hits the target successfully, the CHAIN count will increase. FEVER is activated when CHAIN count reaches 10, and CHAIN number acquired from each successful hit will be doubled in FEVER. In arcade version, TRANCE is activated when CHAIN count reaches 100, and CHAIN number acquired from each successful hit will be quadrupled in TRANCE. However, if the player misses a target, the CHAIN count will be reset and FEVER or TRANCE will end.

After the player finished a song, a RATING (RATE in arcade version) is given, from lowest to highest, E, D, C, B, A, and S (two higher RATING, S+ and S++, are added in the EX and 2OS versions), according to the performance.

The player selects the song first, then the mode to play. However, not all the modes are initially available.
 In 2OS, each song contains EASY, NORMAL, HARD, and for some songs that contains arcade mode stages, AC-EASY, AC-NORMAL, and AC-HARD. HARD, AC-EASY, AC-NORMAL can be unlocked by clearing NORMAL, while AC-HARD can be unlocked by clearing AC-NORMAL.
 In arcade version, each song contains SIMPLE, NORMAL and HARD. Some songs also contains EXTRA, which can be unlocked by getting S-Rank on SIMPLE, NORMAL, and HARD mode of the same song. Starting from 4SR, for the stage with the difficulty of 11 and above, the player need an S-Rank on either one of the stage that contains the difficulty that is lower by 1 than the target difficulty to unlock (For example, to unlock Level 11 the player need an S-Rank on one of the Level 10 stages, and so on.), making two locks on most of the EXTRA mode stages.

Target 
There are various targets in the game. The command required will differ, depending on the target.

 Tap (Hit in AC version)
A circle-shaped target.
When the avatar reaches it, tap the screen. In arcade version, hit either button on the BOOSTERS.
Some Hit notes will jump in from outside of the course line.

 Hold
A circle-shaped target, followed by a colored line traced on the course line.
When the avatar reaches it, tap and hold the screen until the end of the target. In the arcade version, press and hold either button on the BOOSTERS.

 Beat
A target that contains a certain number of diamond-shaped dots chained together on the course line. The Beat target won't appear in EASY/SIMPLE mode.
When the avatar reaches it, tap the screen rapidly until the end of the target. In arcade version, tap the button on both BOOSTERS rapidly.

 Scratch
A circle-shaped target, followed by a colored spiral line behind. The Scratch target won't appear in EASY/SIMPLE mode.
When the avatar reaches it, rub the screen as fast as possible until the end of the target. In arcade version, move the controller back and forth rapidly, without switching BOOSTERs.

 Flick (Slide in arcade versions)
A diamond-shaped target attached with an arrow. The Flick target won't appear in EASY/SIMPLE mode.
When the avatar reaches it, flick the screen into the direction where the arrow points at. In arcade version, move either BOOSTER into the direction where the arrow points at.
Like Hit notes, some Flick notes will jump in from outside of the course line.

 AD-LIB
There are invisible targets called "AD-LIBs". If the player hit the AD-LIB successfully (at least GOOD judgment), "AD-LIB" will be shown beside your avatar and bonus points will be rewarded. It won't count as a MISS if the player misses the AD-LIBs. However, if the player wants to get FULL CHAIN status for the stage, the player has to hit all the targets and AD-LIBs successfully. If any AD-LIB is missed but all the targets are successfully hit, it will be a NO MISS status.
If the player hits the button when no targets around but doesn't hit any AD-LIB, it's a blank hit and a different sound will be heard. A blank hit doesn't affect the play score, but it will affect the reward in multiplayer match.

In the arcade version, new targets are added.

 Dual Tap (Critical in arcade version)
A target with a dot surround by an eight-angle star, noticeably bigger than the Hit target.
When the avatar reaches it in 2OS, tap the screen with two fingers, and in the arcade version, hit both BOOSTER buttons at the same time.
Like Hit notes, some Dual Tap notes will jump in from outside of the course line.

 Dual Hold
A target that starts with a Critical target, followed by two colored lines behind. The Dual Hold target won't appear in EASY/SIMPLE mode.
When the avatar reaches it, tap the screen and hold it with two fingers until the end of the target. 
In arcade version, press and hold both BOOSTER buttons until the end of the target.

 Dual Flick (Dual Slide in arcade version)
A target with two Flick / Slide targets combined. The Dual Flick target won't appear in EASY/SIMPLE mode.
When the avatar reaches it, flick the screen with two fingers to the directions the arrows point at, at the same time. 
In arcade version, move both BOOSTERs into two directions the arrows point at.
If there is a Dual Flick with arrows that point in a similar direction, moving both BOOSTERS in the same direction will suffice.
Like the Slide target, some Dual Slide notes will jump in from outside of the course line.

 Slide Hold
A target that starts with a Flick/Slide target, followed by a thick trail behind. The Flick Hold target won't appear in EASY/SIMPLE mode.
When the avatar reaches it, flick the screen into the direction where the arrow points at, and hold it until the end of the target. 
In arcade version, move either BOOSTER into the direction where the arrow points at, and hold it until the end of the target.

In arcade version since 3LF, if the player managed to clear the stage with full score of 1,000,000, a special clear status, PERFECT, will be rewarded to the player for the stage.

Contents 
Note: To unlock all the unlockable contents in arcade version, a NESiCA IC Card is necessary.

The Unlock Key system is introduced in arcade version since ver. 4.02. After each play, the player receives 1 to 2 keys, depending on the mode they're playing. The player can receive one extra key each time they play the designated song, usually the one chosen for events. The keys can be used to unlock various contents.

Songs
In iOS version, the songs are automatically added into selection as the player levels up.
In arcade version, most of the songs that are unlockable can be unlocked by using Keys, while some of them can be unlocked by achieving certain conditions.

Avatar
New Avatar will be automatically added as the player levels up.
In arcade version, the player can also gets new avatars by completing certain requirements for Events.

Items
There are various items players can select before playing the song. Each item has its own effects on the stages.
Only a type item can be used per stage. Extra EXP points ("GROOVE COINs" in arcade version since 2HF) will be rewarded when the player clears a stage with certain items.
In arcade version since 2HF, due to the "LEVEL" system replaced by "GROOVE COIN" system, some items were replaced into something else. The player can now buy most of the items at the ITEM SHOP in MYPAGE, though some of the items are unavailable to buy and must be unlocked by using Keys.

{| class="wikitable"
|-
! Item !! Effect Description !! iOS Version !! ZERO !! Arcade Version !! EX !! 2HF !! 2OS !! 3LF !! 3EXDP !! 4SR
|-
| FOLLOW / SAFE || Covers a MISS up to GOOD for 10 times.  SAFE is shown beside the avatar when the effect is activated.  (However, the GOODs covered by FOLLOW / SAFE are worth no points.) || (FOLLOW) || (FOLLOW) || (SAFE) || (SAFE) || (SAFE) || (FOLLOW) || (SAFE) || (SAFE) || (SAFE)
|-
| FLICK CHANGE || Converts Flick targets or some special long notes into Taps.  However, this will drastically deplete your maximum score. ||  ||  ||  ||  ||  ||  ||  ||  || 
|-
| VISIBLE || Reveals AD-LIBs to the player. So you can find out where you can make those pretty little bell chimes!  When using this item, some revealed AD-LIBs may fly in from outside of the course line. ||  ||  ||  ||  ||  ||  ||  ||  ||  (Key only)
|-
| EASY TARGET || Convert targets into Hit, Critical, and Hold.  However, maximum play score is depleted.  PERFECT is unavailable if any target is converted. ||  ||  ||  ||  ||  ||  ||  ||  ||  
|-
| MUSIC PLAYER || Play the music correctly regardless of the performance. This machine is no jukebox, but it certainly has some good beats to it! ||  (Avatar Effect) ||  (Avatar Effect) ||  ||  ||  ||  (Avatar Effect) ||  ||  ||  
|-
| MIRROR || Flip the screen horizontally. ||  (Avatar Effect) ||  (Avatar Effect) ||  ||  ||  ||  ||  ||  ||  
|-
| NO WAY || The course line will be invisible. It's like floating in 3D space! ||  ||  ||  ||  ||  ||  ||  ||  ||  
|-
| REVERSE || Flip the screen vertically and horizontally. It's like the final form of MIRROR! ||  ||  ||  ||  ||  ||  ||  ||  ||  
|-
| HIDDEN || Targets disappear just before touching the avatar. Look ahead to see what targets you'll have to react to before they disappear! ||  ||  ||  ||  ||  ||  ||  ||  ||  
|-
| SUDDEN || Targets only appear just before touching the avatar. The polar opposite of HIDDEN. You'd better react fast if you want to survive this one. ||  ||  ||  ||  ||  ||  ||  ||  ||  
|-
| JUST || All but GREAT judgment become MISS.  GREAT will be shown as JUST. It's all or nothing, baby! Quite literally, in fact. ||  ||  ||  ||  ||  ||  ||  ||  ||  
|-
| STEALTH || All targets become invisible. Hope you memorized the layout to the pixel! ||  ||  ||  ||  ||  ||  ||  ||  ||  
|-
| NOTHING || Course line and targets become invisible. ||  ||  ||  ||  ||  ||  ||  ||  ||  
|-
| IMPOSSIBLE || All targets become invisible and all but GREAT judgment become MISS.  This item truly lives up to its name. Can you handle it? ||  ||  ||  ||  ||  ||  ||  ||  ||   
|-
| PERFECT PLAYER || Plays the music correctly and display the sound of AD-LIBs regardless of performance. Like a jukebox, but with those pretty bell sounds added, too! ||  ||  ||  ||  ||  ||  ||  ||  ||  
|-
| ALONE || Make other players' avatar disappear.  Can only be used in Multiplayer mode.  Now, what's so fun about playing together, anyway? ||  ||  ||  ||  ||  ||  ||  ||  ||  
|-
| ONE HAND || Convert two-handed targets into one-handed targets.  However, maximum play score is depleted.  PERFECT is unavailable if any target is converted. ||  ||  ||  ||  ||  ||  ||  ||  ||  
|-
| NO INFO || Displays such as judgment, score, Groove Gauge, player data become invisible. Effect of ALONE is included in multiplayer mode.  ||  ||  ||  ||  ||  ||  ||  ||  ||  
|-
| BREAK || The stage is instantly ended and failed when the player make 10 mistakes.  Can only be used in Solo Play mode. ||  ||  ||  ||  ||  ||  ||  ||  ||  
|-
! colspan="10" | Reward for Event exclusively on Arcade version
|-
| EXP BOOSTER || Doubles the EXP points rewarded for the song. ||  ||  (Avatar Effects) ||  || (since ver. 1.51) ||  ||  ||  ||  ||  
|-
| MAX BOOSTER || Quintuples the EXP points rewarded for the song. ||  ||  ||  || (since ver. 1.51) ||  ||  ||  ||  ||  
|-
| SUPER SAFE || Cover a MISS up to GOOD for 20 times. ||  ||  ||  ||  ||  ||  ||  ||  || (Key only) 
|-
| GC BOOSTER || Doubles the "GROOVE COINs" rewarded for the song. ||  ||  ||  ||  ||  ||  ||  ||  || (Key only) 
|-
| MAX BOOSTER || Quintuples the "GROOVE COINs" rewarded for the song. ||  ||  ||  ||  ||  ||  ||  ||  ||  (Key only)
|-

|}
Skin
When a target is successfully hit, visual effects are displayed.
Usually the visual effect is default, but the player can change the effect before playing a song by selecting Skins.
New Skins will be automatically added into selection as the player levels up. In 2HF, the player can buy Skins with "GROOVE COINs" in Skin Shop at MyPage of Groove Coaster.

Title (Arcade version only)
The player can set the title when selecting Avatars.
New titles will be rewarded as the player completes certain achievements.
The player can also acquire new titles according to the performance of the Events.
In 2, a new titles system is added, in which player can get certain title by getting enough scores in SIMPLE, NORMAL and HARD mode of a song.  (However, the songs released under Game Music Triangle and AOU are not available for this system)

Trophy (Arcade version only)
The player can receive Trophies by playing and getting higher standings in an Event.
Certain Avatars, Songs, and Title can be unlocked with a big enough number of Trophies.

Sound effects (Arcade version only)
The player can change the sound of AD-LIBs and blank hits in mode selecting screen.
Various of the content can be purchased with "GROOVE COINs" in Sound Effects Shop at MyPage of Groove Coaster.

Navigators

Installments

Mobile versions

Groove Coaster (iOS) 
Launched on July 28, 2011, for $2.99.
 There are 29 songs in this version, including downloadable songs. Difficulty is rated on a scale of 0–9.
 Original songs were all composed by Hirokazu Koshio (COSIO) and Shohei Tsuchiya of Zuntata.
 The game also includes songs from some of Taito's other games, including Arkanoid DS, Jet de Go! 2, SHOGUN DEFENSE, Space Invaders Infinity Gene, Music GunGun! and Darius Gaiden, among others.

Groove Coaster Zero (iOS) 
Launched on November 20, 2012, for free. Celebration events were held when the app reached 1,000,000 and 2,000,000 downloads in July 2013 and on May 19, 2014, respectively.
 There were more than 150 songs in this version, including in-app purchases and those as part of limited-time events.
 A difficulty rating of 10 was added.
 Copyrighted songs, including Vocaloid songs, were added. Copyrighted songs with no artist have been placed under the category J-POP.
 The ability to sort tracks has been added, making song selection much easier.
 A login bonus was introduced, awarding either FOLLOW, FLICK CHANGE, or VISIBLE items whenever a player starts the game for the first time on any given day with an internet connection.
 The UPGRADE option from the previous version has been renamed SHOP, which now sells tracks in dedicated packs of four each as well as selected individual tracks from those packs at a discounted price.
 Every 24 hours, an event called RECOMMEND occurs, in which you can play, for one time only, a track which you have not yet obtained, on the EASY difficulty.
 When the 2,000,000 downloads campaign started, the maximum level players can reach has been raised from 100 to 200.

Groove Coaster 2: Original Style (iOS/Android) 
Launched on July 1, 2015, for free on both iOS and Android devices.

On iOS, this app replaces Groove Coaster Zero in the form of an update, and as a result it is impossible to have Zero and 2OS on the same device.

On Android, this is the first Groove Coaster title to be released for the platform.

A 3,000,000 downloads campaign started in August.
 The ability to use multiple fingers has been added, as opposed to allowing just one finger at a time, as was the case in all previous versions. Faster touch gestures are now easier to pull off.
 To correspond with this, most songs now have Arcade Mode added, bringing three additional difficulties made to be played with two fingers (in total, EASY, NORMAL, HARD, AC-EASY, AC-NORMAL, and AC-HARD). Songs with a grayed-out AC label lack Arcade Mode, but may have it in the future. Songs with a blue AC label have Arcade Mode.
 In Arcade Mode, the highest difficulty rating has been raised to 20.
 If a song pack that now has Arcade Mode has been purchased in Groove Coaster Zero, Arcade Mode will become available to play after a $0.99 in-app purchase.
 In addition, any songs earned through leveling up or the new Mission screen will have Arcade Mode for free.
 Calculation for the final score of any given track in Arcade Mode now copies the arcade version scoring.
 Original Style has been added, which allows players to use their device's microphone input to make sounds to play the game. As all targets are converted to Taps in this mode, your score will not be recorded, but still allows you to level up after playing.
 Some new items (MIRROR, NO WAY, REVERSE, HIDDEN, SUDDEN, JUST, and STEALTH) were added from the arcade versions on top of the already existing FOLLOW, FLICK CHANGE, and VISIBLE items, making for 10 types of items total.
 Titles were added from the arcade versions. These are displayed on your status page, friend list, and leaderboards, primarily for bragging rights.
 By meeting set conditions while playing, items, titles, avatars, and even new tracks can be obtained as rewards through the Mission screen.
 2D avatars are now in full color.
 Setting certain options are now possible, including:
 Performance (can be changed by indicating whether or not improvisation and Ad-lib sounds are played and whether or not chain visual effects are displayed)
 Lag adjustment for sound and visuals
 Lag adjustment for correct gesture judgement and input
 Microphone sensitivity adjustment for Original Style
 When the 3,000,000 downloads campaign started, the maximum level players can reach has been raised yet again, this time from 200 to 300.

Arcade versions

Groove Coaster 

Launched on November 5, 2013. The machine is a dedicated housing with a 55-inch liquid crystal monitor.
 Taito's arcade save data service, NESiCA, can save players' play records and track data. The app version is incompatible with the arcade version.
 Titles have been introduced, which are displayed in the leaderboards for bragging rights.
 Unlike on mobile devices, the arcade version is controlled by two controllers called Boosters. The Boosters themselves have one button at the top of each of them, and they are also made to be tilted, similar to a joystick, with the whole hand. This reproduces the Taps or Flicks from the mobile versions. In addition the names of targets have been changed from Tap to Hit and from Flick to Slide. Both Boosters are able to be used at the same time.
 A headphone jack and volume control dial can be found between the Boosters.
 Just before a track starts, instructions on how use the Boosters for each target type in that track are displayed.
 Upon reaching a Chain of 100, the FEVER status from previous versions will become TRANCE, increasing the Chain by four for every target successfully.
 Score calculation has been overhauled. The new scoring systems works as follows:
 The PLAY SCORE encompasses the player's main score in the level before the results screen. In a playthrough with all GREATs and a FULL CHAIN, this score will max out at 850,000 points.
 The CHAIN SCORE is based on how much of the FULL CHAIN is completed during the track. As such, a FULL CHAIN will make this score max out at 100,000 points.
 Lastly, a 50,000 point CLEAR BONUS is earned for simply clearing the track.
 All of these will add up to 1,000,000 points, a perfect score. Ranks of E, D, C, B, A, or S are awarded based on this score.
 One credit would allow two tracks to be played. Failing tracks does not result in a game over.
 On January 10, 2014, one credit would allow three tracks to be played.
 Multiplayer with up to 4 players is supported. Score is not the determining factor in whether players win or lose, but rather by stars earned by meeting certain criteria during the track.
 Songs are sorted into five genres: J-POP, VOCALOID, GAME, VARIETY, and ORIGINAL.

Groove Coaster EX 
[TBA]

Groove Coaster 2: Heavenly Festival 
[TBA]

Groove Coaster 3: Link Fever 
[TBA]

Groove Coaster 4: Starlight Road 
[TBA]

Multiplayer Matching (Arcade version only)
In the arcade version, multiplayer matches are separated into two types: Local Matching and Online Matching.

Local Matching (Multiplayer Mode)
The player can start the play in multiplayer mode. Once a player starts recruiting, a 90-second countdown will start. Other players (up to three more, which can make a four-player match) can join the match before the countdown ends. The recruiting player can also end the recruitment by pressing the BOOSTER button.

Stage selecting is almost the same as single-player mode. Any player can decide the song that will be played in the match. Each player selects their own mode, items, and skins. However, EXTRA mode selecting goes differently. If the songs that contain EXTRA mode were selected by the player that has already unlocked the mode, then all the players can select EXTRA mode. If not, then only the player who has already unlocked the mode can select it.

Online Matching (Event Play)
The system will recruit players from all over the world. Usually, the match begins when the fourth player is recruited. However, a two- or three-player match will be triggered if the system cannot find enough players in a period of time.

Each player selects the song they want to play in a set list. When all players finish selecting, the system will select a song from the players' choices via roulette. The players then select their own mode, items, and skins. The EXTRA mode will be unavailable if the player has not yet unlocked it.

Gameplay
In the stage, the player's own avatar is shown on the course line, while other players are shown beside it.  Also, the player's own rank is shown right below the avatar. As the stage progresses, the relative position of the players' avatars will differ, depending on their own play scores.

When the stage ends, a match result screen will be shown. From 2, the player competes with each other with total number of stars earned from three tunes. The player with the most stars wins the match.
In 3LF, for some rewards, the star given to players will increase in later Tunes, making the game easier to be reversed if any mistake is made. Also the number of stars the player gets in Online Matching will become Battle Point reward, which can be used to compete with others in the Event. Playing in multiplayer mode lets the player receive bonus EXP reward (GC reward in 2) and one extra "MUSIC PANEL".

Critical reception
The game has a Metacritic rating of 87% based on 21 critic reviews.

SlideToPlay said " We don't know what Space Invaders are doing in a rhythm game, but we like it." IGN wrote " Nearly perfect. The music is great. The visuals are great. The rhythm action itself feels tight and perfectly matches each tune. Best of all, this is an experience that would be very hard to replicate on a traditional platform – this is a game built from the ground-up for iPhone, and it shows." The AV Club said " Its elegance surpasses some of its antecedents, like Osu! Tatke! Ouendan! " AppSafari wrote " The bigger screen is nice, but the levels scales so well, you won't miss out by using a smaller one." GamePro said " Groove Coaster is a textbook example of how to make an iOS game correctly. Simple one-finger controls and quick play sessions belie a game with a considerable amount of depth and replay value." DaGameboyz wrote " It's definitely one of the "must plays" of the iOS, and at only $2.99 on the App Store, you should go grab it right now! " PocketGamerUK said " Gorgeous, challenging and thrillingly different, Groove Coaster is a treat for the eyes, the ears, and the soul." Gamezebo said " The only real complaint to be had with Groove Coaster is that there isn't more of it." 148Apps said " Just as crazy-awesome a game as one would expect to get from the people who brought us Space Invaders-Infinity Gene." Multiplayer.it said " Groove Coaster is another little masterpiece by Reisuke Ishida; a great rhythm game that fits perfectly on the Apple devices and that any lover of the genre should check out."

Eurogamer said " Groove Coaster still lacks enough of a challenge to be interesting, and it's only when you play each song on hard that the game's potential reveals itself. Even then, it's unlikely that hardcore rhythm action fiends will care much for its casual approach." MetroCentral said " One of the best marriages of gameplay, graphics and music ever seen on a portable and a triumphant return to the roots of rhythm action." Modojo wrote " A wonderful fusion of stimulating graphics, music and touch based play, making it an essential download for iPhone and iPad users. Great job, Taito." VideoGamer said " Groove Coaster isn't as ambitious a project as Space Invaders Infinity Gene, but it's certainly more fun while it lasts. Whether it's flying along at juddering right angles, or gently cruising around a relaxing curve, Groove Coaster is a consistently enjoyable audiovisual experience." TouchArcdae said "Groove Coaster is a good game with a fundamental flaw. It also has a few nit-picky problems, too, like its spectacularly abrupt ending and horrible "How To," but the strength of its presentation, music, and RPG-lite systems make up for anything that could sour the experience." AppSpy said " While it's not the first time we've seen this blending of visual style and rhythm-based gameplay, Groove Coaster is none-the-less a unique experience that constantly rewards players for delving in again and again." TouchGen wrote " It doesn't quite offer the same originality in gameplay as Bit Trip beat, but its attack on your senses will knock your socks off, and more than makes up for it. Beautiful! "

References

External links
 Groove Coaster EX Official Site (JP)
 Rhythmvaders EX Official Site

2011 video games
Android (operating system) games
Arcade video games
IOS games
Matrix Software games
Square Enix franchises
Music video games
NESiCAxLive games
Video games developed in Japan
Windows games